Goulden may refer to:

Cyril Goulden (1897-1981), Welsh/Canadian geneticist, statistician, and agronomist
Dennis Goulden, film producer and documentarian
Eric Goulden, birth name of Wreckless Eric, singer-songwriter
Ian Goulden, British and Canadian mathematician 
John Goulden, British civil servant
Joseph A. Goulden, member of the U.S. House of Representatives
Joseph C. Goulden (born 1934), American writer
Len Goulden, English footballer
Richard Reginald Goulden, sculptor

See also
Goolden